Industry is a town in Franklin County, Maine, United States. The population was 788 at the 2020 census. It was named from the industrious habits of its citizens.

Geography

Demographics

2010 census
As of the census of 2010, there were 929 people, 376 households, and 264 families living in the town. The racial makeup of the town was 97.2% White, 0.1% African American, 0.2% Native American, 0.1% Asian, and 2.4% from two or more races. Hispanic or Latino of any race were 0.4% of the population.

There were 376 households, of which 31.9% had children under the age of 18 living with them, 57.2% were married couples living together, 9.6% had a female householder with no husband present, 3.5% had a male householder with no wife present, and 29.8% were non-families. 23.9% of all households were made up of individuals, and 8.6% had someone living alone who was 65 years of age or older. The average household size was 2.47 and the average family size was 2.93.

The median age in the town was 44.1 years. 24.3% of residents were under the age of 18; 5.4% were between the ages of 18 and 24; 21.8% were from 25 to 44; 33.3% were from 45 to 64; and 15.5% were 65 years of age or older. The gender makeup of the town was 49.5% male and 50.5% female.

2000 census
As of the census of 2000, there were 790 people, 306 households, and 219 families living in the town. There were 487 housing units at an average density of 16.2 per square mile (6.3/km2). The racial makeup of the town was 98.35% White, 0.63% African American, and 1.01% from two or more races. Hispanic or Latino of any race were 0.51% of the population.

There were 306 households, out of which 28.8% had children under the age of 18 living with them, 62.7% were married couples living together, 4.2% had a female householder with no husband present, and 28.4% were non-families. 20.6% of all households were made up of individuals, and 8.2% had someone living alone who was 65 years of age or older.  The average household size was 2.58 and the average family size was 2.97.

In the town, the population was spread out, with 25.9% under the age of 18, 6.3% from 18 to 24, 30.1% from 25 to 44, 24.6% from 45 to 64, and 13.0% who were 65 years of age or older.  The median age was 39 years. For every 100 females, there were 101.0 males.  For every 100 females age 18 and over, there were 101.7 males.

The median income for a household in the town was $32,292, and the median income for a family was $36,875. Males had a median income of $29,375 versus $18,875 for females. The per capita income for the town was $14,403.  About 13.1% of families and 18.1% of the population were below the poverty line, including 20.6% of those under age 18 and 18.0% of those age 65 or over.

Notable people 

 Will Bonsall, author, seed saver and veganic farmer

References

Further reading
  A History of the Town of Industry: Franklin County, Maine. By William Collins Hatch. Published 1893.

Towns in Franklin County, Maine
Towns in Maine